The 315th Air Division is an inactive United States Air Force formation. Originally designated the 315th Bombardment Wing, it was activated in July 1944 at Peterson Field, Colorado as a command and control organization for four very heavy B-29 Superfortress bombardment groups. It supervised the 16th, 331st, 501st and 502nd Bombardment Groups in the Mariana Islands during the last stages of the Second World War. Its last assignment was with Pacific Air Forces, based at Tachikawa Air Base, Japan. The division was inactivated in April 1969.

History

World War II

The 315th Bombardment Wing was activated in July 1944 at Peterson Field, Colorado as a command and control organization for four very heavy Boeing B-29 Superfortress bombardment groups. The wing trained in Colorado while subordinate groups were trained in Kansas by Second Air Force.

When training was completed, the wing headquarters moved to Guam in the Mariana Islands of the Central Pacific Area in late March 1945. The 315th was the fifth and last B-29 Wing assigned to XXI Bomber Command. Most of the Wing's Groups and Squadrons flew the B-29B aircraft. The limited-production B-29B was designed to was to save weight by removing all of the guns and sighting equipment used on other B-29s, except the tail gun. The weight savings allowed the B-29B to fly a little higher and a little further. The B-29B aircraft also had two new radar units installed. One was the AN/APQ-7 Eagle Radar for bombing and navigation and the other was the AN/APG-15 used for aiming the tail gun. These two radar units gave the B-29B a distinctive shape as the APQ-7 antenna appeared as a small wing under the fuselage, between the two bomb bay doors and the APG-15 added a ball shaped antenna to the tail of the aircraft below the tail guns.

In the Marianas, the Wing commanded the 16th, 331st, 501st, and 502d Bombardment Groups. The 16th and the 501st were the first to arrive in mid April; the 331st and 502d arrived in mid-May 1945.

Its groups flew "shakedown" missions against Japanese targets on Moen Island, Truk, and other points in the Carolines and Marianas.  The 16th and 501st began combat missions over Japan on 26 June with attacks on the Utsube Oil Refinery in Yokkaichi.  The 315th and 502d did not engage in combat until 1 August with attacks on the Mitsubishi Havana Oil Refinery in Kawasaki.  For all four groups, oil industry targets in Japan were its primary targets.

The wing flew its last combat missions on 14 August when hostilities ended.  Afterwards, the wing's B 29s carried relief supplies to Allied prisoner of war camps in Japan and Manchuria.   Due to their late arrival in the theater, the groups demobilized slowly, not returning to the United States until April/May 1946.

The Wing then moved to Ashiya Army Airbase, Japan at the end of May 1946 to become part of the Fifth Air Force Occupation forces. It was re-designated as the 315th Composite Wing in January 1946 and controlled a mixture of fighter and bomber units performing occupation duty and providing air defense over Japan during the occupation era (1945–1950). The division was relieved of occupation duty and inactivated in March 1950

Korean War

With the outbreak of the Korean War, the division was again activated in January 1951 and reassigned to Far East Air Forces.  It was re-designated as the 315th Air Division (Combat Cargo) and took over the resources of the Far East Air Forces Combat Cargo Command (Provisional), which was set up in June 1950 in the immediate aftermath of the North Korean invasion of the south.

It assumed command and control of the following units:
 437th Troop Carrier Wing (C-46 Commando)
 374th Troop Carrier Wing (C-46 Commando, C-47 Skytrain, C-54 Skymaster)
 61st Troop Carrier Group (C-54 Skymaster)
 314th Troop Carrier Group (C-119 Flying Boxcar)

During the Korean War, its components evacuated wounded from Korea, airdropped supplies and personnel, hauled emergency supplies, materiel, replacement troops, mail, rations and ammunition, participated in joint training exercises in Japan, took part in numerous combat missions, and operated regular transport schedules within the Far East area.

Cold War

Before combat operations ceased in Korea, the division began supporting French forces engaged in a war in Indochina. From May 1953 – July 1954, it provided Fairchild C-119 Flying Boxcars to the French, trained French air crews and maintenance personnel, performed additional airlift missions in support of the French, and finally evacuated 509 wounded French troops from Indochina during Operation Wounded Warrior in June-July 1954. "The 14,000-mile airlift carrying the French soldiers followed an eastern route due to political considerations."

In July 1954, the 315th resumed normal airlift operations in the Western Pacific Area and participated in training exercises in Japan.  It continued peacetime readiness operations throughout the 1950s and early 1960s from its base at Ashiya. In 1962, it established airlift support for the expanding conflict in Southeast Asia. Meantime, the division continued its routine airlift in the Far East, flew humanitarian missions, and participated in training exercises when possible.

The crisis prompted by the North Korean seizure of the USS Pueblo in January 1968, found the 315th supporting an emergency airlift to the Republic of Korea.

The 315th AD was inactivated in April 1969 due to budget reductions. Its operational units (314th, 374th and 463d TAW) were reassigned.

Lineage
315th Air Division
 Established as the 315th Bombardment Wing, Very Heavy on 7 June 1944
 Activated on 17 July 1944
 Redesignated 315th Composite Wing on 8 January 1946
 Inactivated on 20 August 1948
 Redesignated 315th Air Division (Combat Cargo) on 10 January 1951
 Activated on 25 January 1951
 Redesignated 315th Air Division on 1 August 1967
 Inactivated on 15 April 1969
 Consolidated with the Table of Distribution 315th Air Division on 1 July 1978 (remained inactive)

Table of Distribution 315th Bombardment Wing
 Established as the 315th Air Division on 13 August 1948
 Organized on 18 August 1948
 Discontinued 1 March 1950
 Inactivated on 20 August 1948
 Consolidated with the 315th Air Division on 1 July 1978

Assignments
 Second Air Force, 17 July 1944 (attached to XXII Bomber Command), c. 14 August-c. 7 December 1944
 Twentieth Air Force, c. 25 March 1945
 XXI Bomber Command, 5 April 1945
 Twentieth Air Force, 16 July 1945
 Fifth Air Force, 30 May 1946
 V Fighter Command, 30 May 1946
 Fifth Air Force, 1 June 1946 – 1 March 1950
 Far East Air Forces (later Pacific Air Forces), 25 January 1951 – 15 April 1969

Components

World War II
 16th Bombardment Group: 14 April 1945 – 15 April 1946
 24th Air Service Group: 14 April 1945 – 15 April 1946
 73d Air Service Group: 12 May 1945 – 15 April 1946
 75th Air Service Group: 15 April 1945 – 15 May 1946
 76th Air Service Group: 12 May 1945 – 15 April 1946
 331st Bombardment Group: 12 May 1945 – 15 April 1946
 501st Bombardment Group: 15 April 1945 – 15 May 1946
 502d Bombardment Group: 12 May 1945 – 15 April 1946

United States Air Force
Wings
 8th Fighter Wing (later 8th Fighter-Bomber Wing): 18 August 1948 – 1 March 1950
 38th Bombardment Wing: 18 August 1948 – 1 April 1949
 314th Tactical Airlift Wing: 22 January 1966 – 8 April 1969
 315th Troop Carrier Wing: 10 June 1952 – 18 January 1955
 347th Fighter Wing: 18 August 1948 – 1 March 1950
 374th Troop Carrier Wing (later 374th Tactical Airlift Wing): 25 January 1951 – 1 July 1957, 8 August 1966 – 8 April 1969
 403d Troop Carrier Wing: 14 April 1952 – 1 January 1953
 437th Troop Carrier Wing: 25 January 1951 – 10 June 1952
 475th Fighter Wing: 18–20 August 1948
 483d Troop Carrier Wing: 1 January 1953 – 25 June 1960
 463d Tactical Airlift Wing : 23 November 1965 – 8 April 1969

Groups
 8th Fighter Group: 31 May 1946 – 18 August 1948
 38th Bombardment Group: 31 May 1946 – 18 August 1948
 61st Troop Carrier Group: attached 25 January 1951 – 21 November 1952
 314th Troop Carrier Group: attached 25 January 1951 – 15 November 1954
 315th Troop Carrier Group (later 315th Air Commando Group): 8 December 1962 – 8 March 1966 (detached entire period)
 316th Troop Carrier Group: attached 15 November 1954 – 18 March 1955, assigned 18 March 1955 – 18 January 1957 (detached entire period)
 347th Fighter Group: 25 September 1947 – 18 August 1948
 6315th Operations Group: 20 October 1964 – 8 August 1966
 Combat Cargo (Troop Carrier) Group, Provisional, 6492d: attached 21 September-8 Dec 1962

Squadrons
 21st Troop Carrier Squadron: 25 June 1960 – 8 August 1966 (detached entire period)
 24th Helicopter Squadron: 13 October 1956 – 8 March 1960
 25th Tactical Reconnaissance Squadron: 31 May 1946 – 28 February 1947, attached 28 February 1947 – 15 April 1948
 29th Troop Carrier Squadron: 27 January-25 Mar 1966
 35th Troop Carrier Squadron: 8 January 1963 – 8 August 1966 (detached entire period)
 38th Tactical Airlift Squadron: attached 8 February-19 Jul 1968
 41st Photographic Reconnaissance Squadron: 18 September 1945 – 4 January 1946
 41st Troop Carrier Squadron: c. 21 November 1965 – 8 August 1966 (detached entire period)
 50th Troop Carrier Squadron: attached 1 October 1951 – 15 November 1954; assigned 26 December 1965 – 23 February 1966
 68th Fighter Squadron: attached 10 April-24 Nov 1947
 345th Troop Carrier Squadron: 1 June 1962 – 8 January 1963; 27 November 1965 – 25 March 1966 (detached entire period)
 346th Tactical Airlift Squadron: attached 7 January-25 Mar 1969
 347th Tactical Airlift Squadron: attached 19 July-18 Oct 1968
 348th Tactical Airlift Squadron: 18 October 1968 – 7 January 1969
 421st Night Fighter Squadron: 31 May 1946 – 20 February 1947
 433d Fighter Squadron: attached 15 October 1946 – 18 November 1947
 776th Troop Carrier Squadron: 26 December 1965 – 25 March 1966
 777th Tactical Airlift Squadron: attached 31 March-1 Aug 1968
 778th Tactical Airlift Squadron: attached 1–23 August 1968
 779th Tactical Airlift Squadron: attached 7 February-31 Mar 1968
 815th Troop Carrier (later, 815th Tactical Airlift) Squadron: 25 June 1960 – 1 November 1968
 817th Troop Carrier Squadron: 25 June 1960 – 8 August 1966 (detached entire period)
 6461st Troop Carrier Squadron (later 6461 Air Transport Squadron): 1 December 1952 – 24 June 1955 (detached entire period)
 6475th Flying Training Squadron: 25 November 1954 – 18 May 1955 (detached entire period)
 6485th Operations Squadron: 17 September 1956 – 1 September 1968; attached 1 December 1968 – 8 April 1969

Stations

 Peterson Field, Colorado, 17 July 1944
 Fort Lawton, Washington, 10–17 March 1945
 Northwest Field, Guam, Mariana Islands, 5 April 1945
 Ashiya Army Air Base, Japan, 30 May 1946

 Itazuke Army Air Base (later Itazuke Airfield, Itazuke Air Base), Japan, 31 May 1946 – 1 March 1950.
 Ashiya Air Station, Japan, 25 January 1951
 Fuchu Air Station, Japan, 5 February 1951
 Tachikawa Air Base, Japan, 24 April 1954 – 15 April 1969

See also

 List of United States Air Force air divisions

References

Notes
 Explanatory notes

 Citations

Bibliography

External links
 315th Bombardment Wing organization
 Boeing B-29B Superfortress

United States Air Force units and formations in the Korean War
Military units and formations established in 1944
Japan campaign
World War II aerial operations and battles of the Pacific theatre
Air divisions of the United States Air Force